The commune of Kiganda is a commune of Muramvya Province in central-western Burundi. The capital lies at Kiganda. In 2007, DGHER electrified one rural village in the commune.

References

Communes of Burundi
Muramvya Province